Benaja Creek is a  long 2nd order tributary to the Haw River, in Rockingham County, North Carolina.

Variant names
According to the Geographic Names Information System, it has also been known historically as Benjar Creek.

Course
Benaja Creek rises on the divide between Benaja Creek and Haw River about 3 miles north of Browns Summit in Rockingham County, North Carolina.  Benaja Creek then flows southeast barely into Guilford County before turning northeast back into Rockingham County to meet the Haw River about 5 miles south of Reidsville, North Carolina.

Watershed
Benaja Creek drains  of area, receives about 46.1 in/year of precipitation, has a topographic wetness index of 421.17 and is about 33% forested.

Natural History
The Rockingham County Natural Heritage Inventory recognized one location in the Benaja Creek watershed, Benaja Alluvial Forest.  Benaja Alluvial Forest is a county significant floodplain/alluvial forest that is part of a larger wetland system.  Skunk cabbage (Symplocarpus foetidus) and overcup oak (Quercus lyrata) are present in this forest.

See also
List of rivers of North Carolina

References

Rivers of North Carolina
Rivers of Guilford County, North Carolina
Rivers of Rockingham County, North Carolina